We Are the Broken is the ninth studio album from Christian rock band Seventh Day Slumber. The album released on May 13, 2014 by VSR Music Group. This album was produced by Jeremy Holderfield and Brent Milligan. The album debut at No. 24 on the Billboard Christian Albums chart.

Background
Seventh Day Slumber released their tenth studio album entitled We Are the Broken with VSR Music Group on May 13, 2014, and it was produced by Jeremy Holderfield and Brent Milligan.

Critical reception

We Are the Broken was met with positive reception from critics. Bert Saraco of CCM Magazine rated the album three stars out of five, commenting how the band on the release are "Rocking with a definite sense of purpose" that contains "Plenty of sound, a little thin on artistry, but an album with a healing message and head-banging rhythms." At New Release Tuesday, Jonathan Francesco rated the album four stars out of five, stating that the release "is a solid return to form that offers a number of potential hits." April Covington of Christian Music Review rated the album four stars out of five, writing that "Seventh Day Slumber rocks out while sharing Christ’s love and saving power on We Are the Broken."

In a nine squares review by Cross Rhythms, Paul S. Ganney describing the project as "One of the best CDs I've reviewed for a while; I just stuck it back on again when it finished." At Jesus Freak Hideout, Michael Weaver rated the album three-and-a-half stars out of five, saying that he "wouldn't say 7DS has reached new heights, but We Are the Broken is a solid step in the right direction." Jesus Freak Hideout's Matthew Morris rated the album three stars out of five, noting how "A little more lyrical and musical variety could have made this a more triumphant return to rock for 7DS."

Julia Kitzing of CM Addict rated the album four-and-a-half stars out of five, remarking that "The words of each of the songs share a powerful message that reaches out to all different ages." At 365 Days of Inspiring Media, Joshua Andre rated the album three-and-a-half stars out of five, indicating how the release "serves as a welcome and enjoyable alternative, for listeners who want more musical variety and edgier rock tunes." In a nine and a half stars review from Jesus Wired, Iain Moss commenting, "With We Are The Broken Seventh Day Slumber are not only back to their best, they may have even elevated their 'best' to new heights."

Commercial performance
For the Billboard charting week of May 31, 2014, We Are the Broken was the No. 24 most sold album in the Christian Albums market, and it was the No. 14 most sold album on the breaking-and-entry chart of the Heatseekers Albums.

Track listing

Chart performance

References

2014 albums
Seventh Day Slumber albums